Hominy Creek is a stream in the U.S. state of Georgia. It is a tributary to the Little Tallapoosa River.

The English-language name Hominy Creek most likely is the translation of an earlier Native American name.

References

Rivers of Georgia (U.S. state)
Rivers of Carroll County, Georgia